Nicola D'Ascenzo (September 25, 1871, Torricella Peligna, Italy – April 13, 1954, Philadelphia, Pennsylvania) was an Italian-born American stained glass designer, painter and instructor. He is best known for creating stained glass windows for the Washington Memorial Chapel in Valley Forge, Pennsylvania; the Nipper Building in Camden, New Jersey; the Loyola Alumni Chapel of Our Lady at Loyola University Maryland; the Folger Shakespeare Library and Washington National Cathedral, both in Washington, D.C.

Biography
He was born in Torricella Peligna, Italy, into a family of artists, metalworkers and armor makers. His immediate family emigrated to the United States in 1882, and settled in Philadelphia, Pennsylvania. Working as a mural painter while in his teens, he attended night classes at the Pennsylvania Academy of the Fine Arts. He attended and then taught at the Pennsylvania Museum School, where he met his wife, fellow instructor Myrtle Dell Goodwin (1864–1954). They married in 1894, and moved to Italy, where he studied at the Scuola Libera in Rome. The couple returned to Philadelphia in 1896, where he worked as a portrait painter and opened D'Ascenzo Studios, initially an interior decorating firm.

D'Ascenzo Studios created Art Nouveau interiors (and later stained glass facades) for Horn & Hardart restaurants, a chain of about fifty automats that began in Philadelphia in 1902. The company's flagship restaurant in New York City (1912) was on Broadway at Times Square.

Stained glass
D'Ascenzo dabbled in stained glass on his own for several years, and studied the craft at the New York School of Design, sometime around 1900. He completed his first stained glass commission in 1904. Initially, he bought glass from local manufacturers, but soon began making his own. Beginning in 1911, he spent his summers in Europe, making a comprehensive study of stained glass in cathedrals. In 1921, he was granted permission to set up scaffolding inside Chartres Cathedral for several weeks, to sketch and examine the windows up close. The following summer he did the same at Leon Cathedral in Spain.

Architect Milton Bennett Medary assembled an extraordinary team of collaborators for his Washington Memorial Chapel (1914–17) in Valley Forge, Pennsylvania – built on the grounds of the Continental Army's 1777–1778 winter encampment. D'Ascenzo Studios created thirteen stained glass windows; Samuel Yellin created wrought iron gates, hardware and locks; Edward Maene created oak reredos, choir stalls and church furniture; and sculptors Franklin Simmons, Alexander Stirling Calder, Bela Pratt, and Martha Maulsby Hovenden created statues and other works. The Reverend W. Herbert Burke, who led the decades-long effort to build the chapel, celebrated its completion:

The glowing imagery of stained glass associated with perpendicular Gothic is seen in full perfection. In this respect the chapel is comparable to the famous Sainte-Chapelle in Paris, but surpasses the European masterpiece in warmth and delicacy of execution as well as in symbolic appeal.

For the bell tower (completed 1953), D'Ascenzo Studios created a mosaic bust of George Washington and a Rose Window: Washington at Prayer.

In 1916, the studio completed four 14 ft (4.27 m)-diameter roundel windows for the tower of the Victor Talking Machine Company in Camden, New Jersey. Each depicted the company's logo – "His Master's Voice" (also known as "Nipper") – a dog listening quizzically to a gramophone. At night, the windows were illuminated, and the west-facing window was visible from Philadelphia, on the opposite side of the Delaware River. The original windows were removed in 1969 and the studio manufactured identical replacement windows which were installed in the tower in 1979. The current tower windows are 2003 reproductions made by another firm. The Camden County Historical Society and the Wolfgram Library at Widener University each possess one of the original windows.

Perhaps D'Ascenzo Studios' most varied commission was for Rodeph Shalom Synagogue (1927) in Philadelphia. The Moorish Revival building was designed by architects (and brothers) Grant and Edward Simon, and nearly every surface in its sanctuary was covered with decoration. The studio designed its murals, twenty stained glass windows (including the glass ceiling of the dome), lighting fixtures, carpets, and even the bronze ark for the Torah. The studio also created the mosaics on the synagogue's façade, whose colors remain vibrant after nearly ninety years.

For the Cathedral of the Air (1930) – a memorial chapel dedicated to World War I aviators, at Naval Air Station Lakehurst in New Jersey – the studio created a set of fifteen stained glass windows depicting the history of aviation. These ranged from Leonardo da Vinci's sketches of flying machines to Charles Lindberg's 1927 flight over the Atlantic Ocean (only three years earlier). Lakehurst was later the site of the 1937 Hindenburg disaster.

In three pairs of windows (1940) for the Cathedral of St. John the Divine in New York City, D'Ascenzo drew parallels between Biblical scenes and contemporary life. The "Press Bay" features Christ preaching and a modern minister at his pulpit; but also a printing press, Samuel Morse and his telegraph, a radio broadcast, and the invention of television. The "Sports Bay" features Samson slaying the lion and Jacob wrestling with the Angel; but also baseball, football, basketball, bicycle racing and other sports. The "Labor Bay" contrasts ancient occupations with modern ones.

Awards and honors

D'Ascenzo was awarded a medal at the 1893 World's Columbian Exposition in Chicago; the 1898 Gold Medal from the T-Square Club of Philadelphia; second prize for craftwork at the 1916 Americanization Through Art Exhibition in Philadelphia (Samuel Yellin was awarded first prize); and the 1925 Gold Medal from the Architectural League of New York. He exhibited at the Pennsylvania Academy of the Fine Arts: 1892–1904, 1916 & 1936. He served as President of the Stained Glass Association of America, 1929–1930. He was a member of the Philadelphia Board of Education (1934–1948), and organized art exhibitions that toured the city's public schools. The University of Pennsylvania hosted a 1938 exhibition of D'Ascenzo's paintings, drawings and stained glass.

Legacy

Between 1904 and 1954, D'Ascenzo Studios completed more than 7,800 stained glass windows.

The "Doubting Thomas" door at Christ Church Cranbrook in Bloomfield Hills, Michigan features a tiny bas-relief portrait of D'Ascenzo as a medieval craftsman. Wood carver Johannes Kirchmayer carved images of the various artisans who worked on the church.

D'Ascenzo, his wife Myrtle G. D'Ascenzo (1864–1954), and son Nicola Goodwin D'Ascenzo (1905–1958) are buried in the churchyard at Washington Memorial Chapel in Valley Forge, Pennsylvania.

The business records of D'Ascenzo Studios and sketches of many of its works are in the collection of the Athenaeum of Philadelphia. Paintings by D'Ascenzo occasionally appear at auction.

Selected works

Religious buildings

Church of the Evangelists (1887–88), Philadelphia, Pennsylvania. D'Ascenzo began as a 16-year-old assistant painter, but later completed five murals on his own. Now the Samuel S. Fleisher Art Memorial.
Murals: Visitation of Our Lady to St. Elizabeth, Nativity of Our Lord, Wedding at Cana (after Giotto), Laying Out of the Lord (after Fra Angelico), Appearance of the Risen Lord to Mary Magdalene (after Giotto).
Mosaics and stained glass windows (1911), St. Francis de Sales Church, Philadelphia, Pennsylvania, Henry Dagit, architect.
Ascension Window (ca. 1912), Church of the Good Shepherd, Scranton, Pennsylvania.
5 windows (1915, 1936, 1940), Trinity Memorial Episcopal Church, Binghamton, New York.
St. Mark's Episcopal Church (1916), Frankford, Philadelphia, Pennsylvania.
Washington Memorial Chapel, Valley Forge, Pennsylvania. D'Ascenzo and his family are buried in the churchyard.
Martha Washington Window: The Abundant Life (1918), north wall (over altar).
George Washington Window (year), south wall (over entrance). Depicts 36 scenes from Washington's life.
East windows – Revolution (1917), Patriotism (1917), The Union (1917), Democracy (1918)
West windows – Discovery (year), Bishop White Window: Settlement (1918), Anthony Wayne Window: Expansion (1921), Alexander Hamilton Window: Development (year) 
Other windows – Carrying the Gospel to the Ends of the Earth, The New Birth and the New Freedom, Freedom through the Word 
Washington at Prayer Rose Window (1953), bell tower chamber.
Mosaic: Bust of George Washington (1953), bell tower chamber.
"Christ in Majesty' tympanum, Fiske Portal (1923), St. Mark's Episcopal Church, Philadelphia, Pennsylvania. The portal was designed by Zantzinger, Borie & Medary. D'Ascenzo Studios created the doors (with ironwork by Samuel Yellin) and the stained glass & polychromed wood "Christ in Majesty" tympanum. 
Dorrance Memorial Window (1924), Church of St. James the Greater, Bristol, Pennsylvania. Awarded the 1925 Gold Medal from the Architectural League of New York.
 17 windows (1924), St. Francis of Assisi Church, Philadelphia, Pennsylvania. Following the church's 2012 closure, the windows were removed and re-installed at Holy Cross Church, Rumson, New Jersey.
Two windows (1926 and 1927), Trinity Church on the Green, New Haven, Connecticut
Sermon on the Mount,  David the Psalmist, and Moses the Law Giver
Angel Gabriel announcing his tidings to the Blessed Virgin Mary 
Windows, All Saints', Wynnewood
Interiors and façade mosaics (1927), Rodeph Shalom Synagogue, Philadelphia, Pennsylvania.
St. Thomas Window (1927–28), St. Thomas Episcopal Church, Fifth Avenue, New York City.
Good Shepherd Window (Cyrus H. K. Curtis Memorial Window) (1928), Unitarian Society of Germantown, Philadelphia, Pennsylvania, Edmund Gilchrist, architect. In 1930, Nicola D'Ascenzo Jr. created a glass mosaic surrounding the window.
D'Ascenzo Studios created 13 additional windows for the church (1928, 1930, 1944). D'Ascenzo and his family were members of the congregation.
Windows (1928), Independent Presbyterian Church, Birmingham, Alabama.
The Second Coming of Christ Window (Great West Window) (1928), Princeton University Chapel, Princeton, New Jersey.
Life of Christ Window (East Window) (1928), Christ Church Cranbrook, Bloomfield Hills, Michigan, Bertram Goodhue, architect. 
 Ten Commandments Rose Window, Annunciation and Visitation Window (1929), Riverside Church, New York City.
History of Aviation Windows (set of 15) (1930), Cathedral of the Air, Naval Air Engineering Station Lakehurst, New Jersey.
Windows (1931), Dwight Memorial Chapel, Yale University, New Haven, Connecticut.
Gideon Egner Memorial Chapel (1931), Muhlenberg College, Allentown, Pennsylvania.
Larchmont Avenue Presbyterian Church, Larchmont, New York. The church features a rose window over the altar, a great hwindow facing west, 2-panel side windows, and 3-panel clerestory windows, all by D'Ascenzo Studios.
Rose Window (1931).
Christ of the Resurrection Window (Great West Window) (1947). A memorial to church members who served in World War II.
Old Testament windows: The Good Samaritan, The Prodigal Son, Moses, Abraham and Isaac, Ruth, Elijah, David, others.
New Testament windows: The Nativity, The Good Shepherd, The Sermon on the Mount, Jesus Blessing the Children, The Last Supper, The Crucifixion, others.
Windows (1934), Chapel of Saint Joseph's Seminary in Plainsboro, New Jersey.
Jesus and the Samaritan Woman Window (1935-1937), Chapel of the Holy Spirit, Washington National Cathedral, Washington, D.C. N.C. Wyeth painted the mural over the altar, and Samuel Yellin created the iron gates.
6 windows ("Press Bay," "Sports Bay," "Labor Bay") (1940), Cathedral of St. John the Divine, New York City.
Conrad Weiser Window (year), Lutheran Theological Seminary, Germantown, Philadelphia, Pennsylvania.
McBrier Window (1930), First Presbyterian Church of the Covenant, Erie, Pennsylvania.

Public buildings
Evolution of the Book Windows (set of 4) (1904), Hatcher Library, University of Michigan, Ann Arbor, Michigan. 
America Receiving the Gifts of Nations (mosaic frieze, 1916), Cooper Library, Johnson Park, Camden, New Jersey. The mosaic frieze is 9 ft (2.74 m) tall and 72 ft (21.95 m) long, and features thirty-eight lifesized figures.
Ages of Man Window (1931), Paster Reading Room, Folger Shakespeare Library, Washington, D.C. Elsewhere in the library are stained glass windows depicting Romeo, Portia, Touchstone, Cardinal Wolsey, and other Shakespearean characters.
Calhoun College (Yale University residential college) (1933), New Haven, Connecticut, John Russell Pope, architect.
Justice is the Queen of Virtues Window (1940), Lobby, Philadelphia Family Court Building, 1801 Vine Street, John T. Windrim, architect.
World War I Memorial Tablet (1943), City Hall, Philadelphia, Pennsylvania.
Agriculture and Industry, Birch Bayh Federal Building and United States Courthouse

Commercial buildings
Horn & Hardart Automat (1902), 818-20 Chestnut St., Philadelphia, Pennsylvania. First automat in the United States. D'Ascenzo Studios created its interiors. 
Horn & Hardart Automat & Cafeteria (1912), 1557 Broadway, New York City. D'Ascenzo Studios created the interiors and the stained glass façade. The facade was removed when the building was converted into a Burger King in the 1970s. It is now Grand Slam, a sports and souvenir shop.
Window of Commerce (1912), Poughkeepsie Savings Bank, Poughkeepsie, New York. Depicts Henry Hudson aboard the Half Moon and Robert Fulton aboard the Clermont.
Little Nipper Windows (set of 4) (1915–16), RCA-Victor Company Headquarters, Camden, New Jersey. 
History of Philadelphia Window (1928), Fidelity–Philadelphia Trust Company Building, Philadelphia, Pennsylvania, Simon & Simon, architects. The 25 ft (7.62 m)-tall window features scenes of William Penn, the Signing of the Declaration of Independence, George Washington as President, the newly-completed Philadelphia Museum of Art; and portrait medallions of famous Philadelphians.

Residences
The Hunt Windows (set of 4) (ca. 1905), Metropolitan Museum of Art, New York City, design attributed to architect Will Price. Made for the Frank van Camp residence, Indianapolis, Indiana.
Paul Revere Window (1923), Cyrus H. K. Curtis residence, Wyncote, Pennsylvania.
Dante and Beatrice Window (1927), Philbrook Museum of Art, Tulsa, Oklahoma.
Thomas J. McKinney residence (1929), Buffalo, New York, James A. Johnson, architect.
Canterbury Pilgrims Windows (set of 9) (1929), Study, Theodore Swann residence, Birmingham, Alabama. This was D'Ascenzo's largest (and most expensive) residential commission. The studio designed individual windows or sets of them for twelve additional rooms.
Caravel Windows (1931), Dining room, Edward Bok residence, Merion, Pennsylvania.

References

Sources
 Frederick E. Mayer, "Nicola D'Ascenzo: Craftsman," The American Magazine of Art, vol. 9, no. 6 (April 1918), pp. 243–47.
 Obituary: "N. D'Ascenzo, Noted for Stained Glass," The New York Times, April 14, 1954.
 Exhibition catalogue: D'Ascenzo: The Art of Stained Glass, from the Collection of Hanley Switlik, Rider College, Trenton, New Jersey, 1973.
 Lisa Weilbacker, "A Study of Residential Stained Glass: The Work of Nicola D'Ascenzo Studios from 1896 to 1954" (PDF), masters thesis, University of Pennsylvania, 1990.

External links
 D'Ascenzo Studios from Philadelphia Architects and Buildings.
 Nicola D'Ascenzo, from University of the Arts Library.
 Nicola D'Ascenzo from Live Auctioneers.

1871 births
1954 deaths
Italian emigrants to the United States
American stained glass artists and manufacturers
Artists from Philadelphia
Pennsylvania Academy of the Fine Arts alumni
University of the Arts (Philadelphia) alumni